Í Hakanum is a 1980 studio album by Mezzoforte, released on Steinar and originally released in Iceland only. The September 1981 UK release, titled Mezzoforte, had a different cover artwork, but since their first album, released only in Iceland, too was called Mezzoforte, Í Hakanum was usually referred to as Octopus, which later became the title of the 1996 CD re-release. 

Seven of the eight tracks were included in 1983 on the compilation album Catching Up With Mezzoforte which also included 7 songs from their third album, Þvílíkt Og Annað Eins and peaked at #95 on the UK Album Chart. The song Shooting Star was released in 1982 on a double A-side single with third album’s Dreamland. Midnight Express was released on a single in 1983 along with its live version from the Spelllifandi album.

Background
Though still in their teens, members of Mezzoforte were already working as session musicians in Iceland, playing in various bands and backing singers. After their debut album as a quartett, Bjorn Thorarensen joined Mezzoforte as a second keyboard player.
Í Hakanum was the first Mezzoforte album, produced by Geoff Calver. Recordings took place at Hot Ice Studios in Hafnarfjörður, Iceland from mid August to mid October 1980 with some additional recordings and mixing in London’s Red Bus Studios in late October. The album features Kristinn Svavarsson on sax, who became a full member of the band in 1982.

Cover
The cover of Í Hakanum’s original Icelandic edition was changed for the international release. Since then the album was usually referred to as Octopus (see also the lead section), under which title it was re-released on CD in 1996 with its 1981 cover redesigned in accordance with the art concept of the reissue series.  Ron Aspery’s surname is misspelled on all editions as Asprey.

Track listing

Personnel
Mezzoforte:
Fridrik Karlsson – Guitar (Yamaha electric, Martin acoustic, Eko classical)
Eythor Gunnarsson – Keyboard (Rhodes, Mini-Moog, Yamaha and Roland Synthesizers)
Johann Asmundsson – Bass (Yamaha electric, Kramer fretless)
Gulli Briem – Drums (Premier drums, Gravier fire extinguisher)
Bjorn Thorarensen – Keyboard (Roland Jupiter, ARP Odyssey)

Additional musicians:
Kristinn Svavarsson – Saxophone (2, 7)
Bobby Harrison – Congas (5)
Ellen Kristjánsdóttir – Voice (2, 5)
Shady Owens – Voice (2, 5)
Ron Aspery – Saxophone (3, 5)
Louis Jardim – Percussion, Bits And Pieces Here And There
Mezzoforte – Claps and snaps

Technical:
Ernst J. Backman: Original International Artwork
Geoff Calver: Producer, Engineer
Jonatan Gardarsson: Editor
Eirikur Ingolfsson – 1996 Liner notes
Seventh Heaven: 1996 Artwork and design
Oskar Pall Sveinsson: 1996 Digital Remaster

Release history

References

1980 albums
Mezzoforte (band) albums